Portulaca oleracea subsp. sativa also known as golden purslane is one of few subspecies of Portulaca oleracea (common purslane).

Description
The leaves are much bigger, more yellow in colour and less succulent than other subspecies, also the stems are mostly the same colour of the leaves.

References 

oleracea subsp. sativa
Plant subspecies